Engineering Pathway is a  web portal to teaching and learning resources in applied science and math, engineering, computer science/information technology and engineering technology.  It is the engineering education "wing" of the National Science Digital Library (NSDL).

Engineering pathway is for K-12 students and university educators and students. 

The Engineering Pathway uses ABET accreditation criteria to tag educational resources with this criteria and link teaching resources to research on outcomes assessment. It has also established community groups for each ABET accredited disciplines in Engineering and Computing.

External links
Engineering Pathway Digital Library
National Science Digital Library
NSF NSDL Program Description

Science and technology in the United States
Engineering education
Discipline-oriented digital libraries
American digital libraries